Mayfield Road, 111 Avenue (Norwood Boulevard), and 112 Avenue is a major arterial road in north Edmonton, Alberta. It serves Edmonton's Northwest Industrial District, the former Town of Jasper Place (amalgamated with Edmonton in 1964), the inner city north Downtown Edmonton, and post-World War II Edmonton. Prior to the opening of Yellowhead Trail in the early 1980s, Highway 16 followed Mayfield Road and 111 Avenue between Stony Plain Road and 109 Street.

Overview

Mayfield Road
The roadway begins as "Mayfield Road" and runs northeast from 170 Street, north of Stony Plain Road, and travels north-east for approximately  before it turns east and continues as 111 Avenue. Originally there was an interchange at the intersection of Mayfield Road, Stony Plain Road, and 170 Street where through traffic travelled from Highway 16 west (presently part of Stony Plain Road) to Mayfield Road. The interchange was removed in the mid-1980s as part of a larger project that included converting Stony Plain Road and 100 Avenue to one-way streets and accommodating increased traffic on 170 Street.

111 Avenue
At 163 Street, Mayfield Road turns east and becomes the main segment of 111 Avenue; it forms the boundary between the residential areas of the former town of Jasper Place and Northwest Industrial District. At 142 Street, 111 Avenue passes through the Edmonton's Central core residential neighbourhoods, passing a number of landmarks including the Telus World of Science, Westmount Centre, Kingsway Mall, Royal Alexandra Hospital, and Glenrose Rehabilitation Hospital. The portion between 101 Street and 90 Street has the name "Norwood Boulevard" in addition to 111 Avenue, this name has remained since the City of Edmonton decided to number its streets, but keep a select few names.

111 Avenue also has a western segment which continues west of Mayfield Road. It is a collector road which originates at Anthony Henday Drive, passes through the northwestern industrial areas, and ends at 163 Street just north its intersection with 111 Avenue / Mayfield Road.

112 Avenue
At 90 Street the roadway becomes 112 Avenue and passes Commonwealth Stadium. To the east, it enters post-World War II neighbourhoods that are aligned with the North Saskatchewan River and at 76 Street, just west of Wayne Gretzky Drive, it begins run northeast. 112 Avenue ends at 50 Street between 114 Avenue and 115 Avenue, three blocks south of 118 Avenue. The misalignment of cross-streets along 50 Street is due to the street layout of the former town of Beverly.

Redevelopment
On February 25, 2013 City Council passed a motion and will start evaluating option 2 for 111 Avenue redevelopment with a target area between 82 Street and 101 Street

Option 2: Improve Physical Infrastructure along Norwood Boulevard. Coordinate a streetscape plan that incorporates
landscape infrastructure conducive to enhancing connectivity to surrounding initiatives and projects.  This could include intersection modifications and associated landscape improvements on 96 Street and 95 Street linking to neighbourhood revitalization projects, business revitalization zones and others.  Adapt existing eligibility requirements for the Façade Improvement Program and the Development Incentive Program to enable property owners along Norwood Boulevard to access funding. Currently, Façade Improvement Program funding is limited to projects within existing Business Revitalization Zone
boundaries. A capital program and cost estimate for streetscape improvements would need to be developed. Physical infrastructure improvements are generally seen as a mechanism for encouraging business development in a given area.

Neighbourhoods

List of neighbourhoods Mayfield Road, 111 Avenue, and 112 Avenue runs through, in order from west to east.
Britannia Youngstown
Mayfield
High Park
McQueen
North Glenora
Woodcroft
Inglewood
Westmount
Prince Rupert
Queen Mary Park
Central McDougall
Spruce Avenue
McCauley
Alberta Avenue
Parkdale
Cromdale
Virginia Park
Bellevue
Highlands

Major intersections

West segment

See also 

 List of avenues in Edmonton
 Transportation in Edmonton

References

Roads in Edmonton